Tudor most commonly refers to:
 House of Tudor, English royal house of Welsh origins
 Tudor period, a historical era in England coinciding with the rule of the Tudor dynasty

Tudor may also refer to:

Architecture
 Tudor architecture, the final development of medieval architecture during the Tudor period (1485–1603)
 Tudor Revival architecture, or Mock Tudor, later emulation of Tudor architecture
Tudor House (disambiguation)

People
 Tudor (name)

Other uses
 Montres Tudor SA, a Swiss watchmaker owned by Rolex
 United SportsCar Championship, sponsored by the Tudor watch brand in 2014
 , a British submarine
 Tudor, a fictional city, based on Elizabeth, New Jersey, seen in the video game Grand Theft Auto IV
 Tudor, California, unincorporated community, United States
 Tudor, Mombasa, Kenya
 The Tudors, a TV series
 Tudor domain, in molecular biology
 Tudor rose, the traditional floral heraldic emblem of England
 Avro Tudor, a type of aeroplane
 Tudor, a name for two-door sedan body used by some manufacturers
 Tudor batteries, a brand of batteries
 Tudor Crisps, a brand of potato crisps

See also
 Tudor rose (disambiguation)
 
 
 Tudur (disambiguation)
 Tewdwr Mawr (fl. 544–577), Breton king